Gunnar Georg Emanuel Sträng (23 December 1906 – 7 March 1992) was a Swedish Social Democratic politician, most known for being Sweden's longest serving minister for finance.

Sträng grew up in a working-class family in Lövsta, today a part of Stockholm Municipality. After finishing school he started work as a gardener. In 1927 he joined the local branch of the gardeners' union and was soon elected to the board as secretary. A few years later, in 1932, he was elected as an official to the national union organisation for agricultural workers, with the task of recruiting new members in order to force the employers to consent to collective bargaining. In 1938, he was elected vice chairman of the trade union and the following year he succeeded the chairman.

Through the Swedish Trade Union Confederation Sträng was appointed as a representative on various state committees, and on 6 July 1945 Prime Minister Per Albin Hansson offered him the position of minister of agriculture. Sträng turned him down, but a few days later he accepted the position of cabinet member, although not with the title of minister. In 1947 Sträng was made minister of supply and implemented harsh measures, such as petroleum rationing. The following year he accepted the role of minister of agriculture, and in 1951 he became minister for social affairs. During this period, health insurance was made mandatory through a state system.

On 12 September 1955 Sträng was made minister for finance. One of the major reforms during his time in office was the introduction of value-added tax. Joint taxation of spouses was abolished, a change that made it more economically attractive for women to seek paid employment. The Social Democrats, together with the Centre Party, also engineered the Swedish newspaper subsidy system, created to support the smaller newspapers in a region in order to prevent "newspaper death" and preserve diversity.

When the Social Democrats did poorly in the 1956 elections, party leader Tage Erlander offered to step down and Sträng was offered the opportunity to take over the leadership – but refused. He remained minister for finance until the Social Democrats lost power to the centre-right in the 1976 elections.

Sträng was generally regarded as economically prudent. He was known for wearing "both suspenders and a belt", also a striking symbol of his careful general attitude. He was also known to have a photographic memory and was able to quote the figures from the national budget by heart in his annual presentations on television and made this dull subject something of a popular event. For the Swedish people he was very highly respected as a trustworthy national householder of the Swedish economy. His powerful position both inside and outside of the cabinet has led to comparisons to Gustav Vasa.

He was awarded the Illis quorum by the government of Sweden in 1984.

He died in Stockholm in 1992.

References 

1906 births
1992 deaths
Swedish Social Democratic Party politicians
Swedish Ministers for Finance
Swedish Ministers for Social Affairs
Members of the Första kammaren
Recipients of the Illis quorum